Lady Aryeong (a.k.a. Al-yeong, Al-yong) was married to Hyeokgeose of Silla who was the founder of Silla. According to Samguk Yusa (Memorabilia of the Three Kingdoms), Aryeong was born from the left side of the dragon which appeared near the well. However, the Samguk Sagi (History of the Three Kingdoms), says it was the right side.

History 
According to the Samguk sagi, In the spring of the 5th year (B.C. 53) a dragon appeared in the Alyeongjeong(閼英井). A girl was born on the right side. Old age woman(老嫗) found it bizarre and raised it. As she grew up, her virtue and appearance were outstanding, and King greeted her when he heard the news and made a queen. At this time, people called them two saints.

Historical context 
According to the Samguk Yusa, A ship carrying Talhae reached Azin Port(阿珍浦口). That was 39th year (B.C.19). At that time, an old mother(老母) on the beach collected and raised him. The old mother's name is Ahjinuisun(阿珍義先). The Hyukgeose's fishing grandmother(海尺之母) is Ahjinuisun(阿珍義先) too. 
In record "she didn't know if it was good or bad, so she went to the sky". Based on this record, Old mother(老母) is Jinhan's shaman and ArYeong's old age woman(老嫗) may also symbolize the same shaman group. addition, it can be inferred that Aryeong is highly related to shaman based on the record of Namhae Chachaung(南解 次次雄) who is Aryeong's son, a Silla dialect, "Chachaung"(次次雄) calling a shaman.

It can also be interpreted that Alyeong has the character of representing the natives in the early days of the foundation of Saro, from being described as another saint(聖人).

Outline 
Lady Aryeong was a daughter of Lady Saso who was said to come from the Chinese royal family and moved to the Jinhan confederacy according to legends. However, whether Lady Saso was of Chinese origin is attested and is highly unlikely, considering the fact that deitifications were common back in the days when the 'Middle Kingdoms (中原)' was considered the center of civilization. The sources of these claims also comes from China during the Song Dynasty, roughly a thousand years later; something highly respected scholars and bureaucrats such as Kim Bu-sik (who is of royal Silla descent) has never heard of.

She was married to Hyeokgeose of Silla who was the founder of Silla and he was also a son of Lady Saso. According to Samguk Yusa (Memorabilia of the Three Kingdoms), Aryeong was born from the left side of the dragon which appeared near the well. However, the Samguk Sagi (History of the Three Kingdoms), says it was the right side. According to the Buddhist monk Il-yeon, the “dragon” in these histories refers to Lady Saso.

The following description is from the Samguk Yusa (Memorabilia of the three Kingdoms), volume 5, clause 7.

However, the first mention of "Gye-Rim (Hangul:계림), Gye (Hangul:계)" is mentioned for the first time in the Kim Al-ji legend.

Family

Worship 
She was worshipped as a goddess after death. She was worshipped during droughts, as it was believed she could pour water to stimulate rain. Her holy well was a place of pilgrimage for women who wished to become pregnant.

References 

Silla people
Royal consorts of Silla